"Timeless" is the first single from the 3rd Studio album by the German band Queensberry.

Formats and track listings
CD single
Timeless (Single Version) – 3:19
Timeless (Karaoke Version) – 3:19

Gold Edition
Timeless (Single Version) – 3:19
Timeless (Instrumental Version) – 3:19
Timeless (Plastic Funk Mix) – 5:42
Timeless (Miami Inc Mix) – 3:42

Charts
German Singles Chart #90

References

2012 singles
Queensberry (band) songs
Warner Records singles
Songs written by Ryan Ogren
2012 songs
Songs written by Nick Bailey